The Malta Rugby Football Union (MRFU) is the governing body for all Rugby Union in Malta. The MRFU is a full member of Rugby Europe and World Rugby. The MRFU is a  member of SportMalta, the Maltese islands national sports body.

On 14 September 2016, Steve Busuttil defeated the incumbent Brian Dalton in the election for President of the Union.

The Board of the Union is as follows:

President: Kevin Buttigieg
Vice-President: George Zammit Montebello
Secretary General: Rhona Xerri 
Treasurer: Michael Borg
PRO: Ian Aquilina

See also
 Rugby union in Malta
 Malta national rugby union team

References

External links
Malta Rugby Union official website

Rugby union in Malta
Sports governing bodies in Malta
Rugby union governing bodies in Europe
Sports organizations established in 1991
1991 establishments in Malta